Ineta Radēviča (born 13 July 1981 in Krāslava, Soviet Union) is a retired Latvian athlete, competing in the long jump and triple jump.

Radēviča won the bronze medal in the 2003 European U-23 championship. She has also won two NCAA championships, while competing for the University of Nebraska. In the 2004 Summer Olympics, she was 13th in the triple jump and 20th in the long jump. Radēviča became popular after posing nude for Playboy magazine before the 2004 Summer Olympics. She finished fifth at the 2006 IAAF World Indoor Championships and eighth at the 2007 European Athletics Indoor Championships. By the time 2008 Summer Olympics were held, she was pregnant and missed the competition.

At the 2010 European Championships she won the long jump event with a new Latvian record of 6.92 metres. In 2011, she won the bronze medal in the World Championships in Daegu with a result of 6.76 metres. In 2017 she received Silver medal when results were updated because of past doping offenses.

At the 2012 Summer Olympics she placed fourth, with Janay DeLoach finishing just one centimeter ahead of her. Afterwards she realised her dream of earning an Olympic medal was not going to happen, and she retired to devote herself to her family, ending her professional career.

In May 2019, following reanalysis of her samples from the 2012 Olympics, which tested positive for oxandrolone metabolites, she was disqualified from the Olympic Games.

Radēviča was coached by Evgeny Ter-Ovanesov.

Achievements

Personal bests

Personal life
She is married to Russian ice hockey player Petr Schastlivy and has 2 sons and a daughter.

References

External links 
 
 
 
 

1981 births
Living people
Athletes (track and field) at the 2004 Summer Olympics
Athletes (track and field) at the 2012 Summer Olympics
European Athletics Championships medalists
Latvian female long jumpers
Latvian female triple jumpers
Olympic athletes of Latvia
People from Krāslava
University of Nebraska–Lincoln alumni
World Athletics Championships medalists
Latvian sportspeople in doping cases
Doping cases in athletics